A tompoes or tompouce is a pastry in the Netherlands and Belgium. It is the local variety of the mille-feuille or Napoleon, introduced by an Amsterdam pastry baker and named after Admiraal Tom Pouce, the stage name of the Frisian dwarf Jan Hannema.

Customs
In the Netherlands, the tompoes is iconic, and the market allows little variation in form, size, and colour. It must be rectangular, with two layers of puff pastry. The icing is smooth and pink, or occasionally white. For many years, however, the top layer has been orange on Koningsdag (King's Day), and a few days before. It may also be orange-coloured when the national football team plays in large international tournaments; this dates from about 1990. The filling is invariably sweet, yellow pastry cream. Tompouces are sometimes topped with whipped cream. Variations with different fillings or with jelly are comparatively rare and are not called tompoes. 

Several variations exist in Belgium. White glazing on top is the norm in Belgium, sometimes with a chocolate pattern similar to mille-feuille. The boekske (lit. 'booklet') may have a sugar finish and may be square. Belgians also use the spelling tompouce or call them glacé (referring to the glazing).

Eating the tompouce

The cakes are usually served with tea or coffee, and in formal settings are eaten with pastry forks. But the hard biscuit-like layers, which squash the pastry cream when trying to cut a piece off, make this difficult and messy, inspiring the humorous article "Hoe eet je een tompoes?" ('How do you eat a tompouce?').

An easier, yet slightly less dignified way of eating a tompouce, is to take the frosted top layer off the pastry and hold it in one hand, with the bottom half in the other and then take sequential bites, one from the top and one from the bottom. Even then, the pastry cream tends to ooze out onto the hand.

The tompouce can also be eaten by flipping it on its side, then slicing it in the other direction into bite-size pieces.

See also
 Cremeschnitte
 Mille-feuille
 Napoleonka (kremówka)
 List of custard desserts

References

External links

Dutch pastries